Antonakis is a given name and surname that by Greek naming conventions is a diminutive form of Antonis. It may be derived from the Italian surname Antonacci; the Cretan variant of Antonaki (which had a strong Venetian influence) is pronounced like the Italian Antonacci.

Given name
Antonakis Andreou (born 1974), Cypriot sports shooter.

Surname
John Antonakis (born 1969), South African professor of organizational behavior 
Tasos Antonakis (born 1992), Greek basketball player

See also

Stephen Antonakos

Notes

Greek-language surnames